The Uyghurs, alternatively spelled Uighurs, Uygurs or Uigurs, are a  Turkic ethnic group originating from and culturally affiliated with the general region of Central and East Asia. The Uyghurs are recognized as native to the Xinjiang Uyghur Autonomous Region in Northwest China. They are one of China's 55 officially recognized ethnic minorities. The Uyghurs are recognized by the Chinese government as a regional minority and the titular people of Xinjiang.

The Uyghurs have traditionally inhabited a series of oases scattered across the Taklamakan Desert within the Tarim Basin. These oases have historically existed as independent states or were controlled by many civilizations including China, the Mongols, the Tibetans and various Turkic polities. The Uyghurs gradually started to become Islamized in the 10th century and most Uyghurs identified as Muslims by the 16th century. Islam has since played an important role in Uyghur culture and identity.

An estimated 80% of Xinjiang's Uyghurs still live in the Tarim Basin. The rest of Xinjiang's Uyghurs mostly live in Ürümqi, the capital city of Xinjiang, which is located in the historical region of Dzungaria. The largest community of Uyghurs living outside of Xinjiang are the Taoyuan Uyghurs of north-central Hunan's Taoyuan County. Significant diasporic communities of Uyghurs exist in other Turkic countries such as Kazakhstan, Kyrgyzstan, Uzbekistan and Turkey. Smaller communities live in Saudi Arabia, Jordan, Australia, Russia and Sweden.

Since 2014, the Chinese government has subjected Uyghurs living in Xinjiang to widespread human rights abuses including forced sterilization and forced labor. Scholars estimate that at least one million Uyghurs have been arbitrarily detained in the Xinjiang internment camps since 2017; Chinese government officials claim that these camps, created under CCP general secretary Xi Jinping's administration, serve the goals of ensuring adherence to Chinese Communist Party (CCP) ideology, preventing separatism, fighting terrorism, and providing vocational training to Uyghurs. Various scholars, human rights organizations and governments consider abuses perpetrated against the Uyghurs to amount to crimes against humanity or genocide.

Etymology
In Chinese, this is transcribed into characters as  / , which is romanized in pinyin as Wéiwú'ěr.

In English, the name is officially spelled Uyghur by the Xinjiang government but also appears as Uighur, Uigur and Uygur. (These reflect the various Cyrillic spellings Уиғур, Уигур and Уйгур.)

The term's original meaning is unclear. Old Turkic inscriptions record a word uyɣur; an example is found on the Sudzi inscription, "I am khan ata of Yaglaqar, came from the Uigur land.". It is transcribed into Tang annals as  /  (Mandarin: Huíhé, but probably *[ɣuɒiɣət] in Middle Chinese). It was used as the name of one of the Turkic polities formed in the interim between the First and Second Göktürk Khaganates (AD630–684). The Old History of the Five Dynasties records that in 788 or 809, the Chinese acceded to a Uyghur request and emended their transcription to  /  (Mandarin: Huíhú, but [ɣuɒiɣuət] in Middle Chinese).

Modern etymological explanations for the name Uyghur range from derivation from the verb "follow, accommodate oneself" and adjective "non-rebellious" (i.e., from Turkic uy/uð-) to the verb meaning "wake, rouse or stir" (i.e., from Turkic oðğur-). None of these is thought to be satisfactory because the sound shift of /ð/ and /ḏ/ to /j/ does not appear to be in place by this time. The etymology therefore cannot be conclusively determined and its referent is also difficult to fix. The "Huihe" and "Huihu" seem to be a political rather than a tribal designation or it  may be one group among several others collectively known as the Toquz Oghuz. The name fell out of use in the 15th century, but was reintroduced in the early 20th century by the Soviet Bolsheviks to replace the previous terms Turk and Turki. The name is currently used to refer to the settled Turkic urban dwellers and farmers of the Tarim Basin who follow traditional Central Asian sedentary practices, distinguishable from the nomadic Turkic populations in Central Asia.

The earliest record of a Uyghur tribe appears in accounts from the Northern Wei (4th–6th century A.D.), wherein they were named  Yuanhe (< MC ZS *ɦʉɐn-ɦət) and derived from a confederation named  /  (lit. "High Carts"), read as Gāochē in Mandarin Chinese but originally with the reconstructed Middle Chinese pronunciation *[kɑutɕʰĭa], later known as the Tiele ( / , Tiělè). Gāochē in turn has been connected to the Uyghur Qangqil ( or Қаңқил).

Identity

Throughout its history, the term Uyghur has had an increasingly expansive definition. Initially signifying only a small coalition of Tiele tribes in northern China, Mongolia and the Altai Mountains, it later denoted citizenship in the Uyghur Khaganate. Finally, it was expanded into an ethnicity whose ancestry originates with the fall of the Uyghur Khaganate in the year 842, causing Uyghur migration from Mongolia into the Tarim Basin. The Uyghurs who moved to the Tarim Basin mixed with the local Tocharians, and converted to the Tocharian religion, and adopted their culture of oasis agriculture. The fluid definition of Uyghur and the diverse ancestry of modern Uyghurs create confusion as to what constitutes true Uyghur ethnography and ethnogenesis. Contemporary scholars consider modern Uyghurs to be the descendants of a number of peoples, including the ancient Uyghurs of Mongolia migrating into the Tarim Basin after the fall of the Uyghur Khaganate, Iranic Saka tribes and other Indo-European peoples inhabiting the Tarim Basin before the arrival of the Turkic Uyghurs.

Uyghur activists identify with the Tarim mummies, remains of an ancient people inhabiting the region, but research into the genetics of ancient Tarim mummies and their links with modern Uyghurs remains problematic, both to Chinese government officials concerned with ethnic separatism and to Uyghur activists concerned the research could affect their indigenous claim.

Genetics research based on mtDNA and Y-DNA largely supports the Uyghur claim of indigenous descent. The Uyghurs are a mixed population, with predominantly East Eurasian maternal lineages and West Eurasian paternal lineages, and in this respect are similar to the Bronze Age mummies of the Tarim Basin.

Origin of modern nomenclature

The term "Uyghur" was not used to refer to a specific existing ethnicity in the 19th century:  it referred to an 'ancient people'. A late-19th-century encyclopedia entitled The Cyclopædia of India and of Eastern and Southern Asia said "the Uigur are the most ancient of Turkish tribes and formerly inhabited a part of Chinese Tartary (Xinjiang), now occupied by a mixed population of Turk, Mongol and Kalmuck". Before 1921/1934, Western writers called the Turkic-speaking Muslims of the oases "Turki" and the Turkic Muslims who had migrated from the Tarim Basin to Ili, Ürümqi and Dzungaria in the northern portion of Xinjiang during the Qing dynasty were known as "Taranchi", meaning "farmer". The Russians and other foreigners referred to them as "Sart", "Turk" or "Turki". In the early 20th century they identified themselves by different names to different peoples and in response to different inquiries: they called themselves Sarts in front of Kazakhs and Kyrgyz while they called themselves "Chantou" if asked about their identity after first identifying as a Muslim. The term "Chantou" (meaning "Rag head" or "Turban Head") was used to refer to the Turkic Muslims of Xinjiang, including by Hui (Tungan) people. These groups of peoples often identify themselves by their originating oasis instead of an ethnicity; for example those from Kashgar may refer to themselves as Kashgarliq or Kashgari, while those from Hotan identity themselves as "Hotani". Other Central Asians once called all the inhabitants of Xinjiang's Southern oases Kashgari, a term still used in some regions of Pakistan. The Turkic people also used "Musulman", which means "Muslim", to describe themselves.

Rian Thum explored the concepts of identity among the ancestors of the modern Uyghurs in Altishahr (the native Uyghur name for Eastern Turkestan or Southern Xinjiang) before the adoption of the name "Uyghur" in the 1930s, referring to them by the name "Altishahri" in his article Modular History: Identity Maintenance before Uyghur Nationalism. Thum indicated that Altishahri Turkis did have a sense that they were a distinctive group separate from the Turkic Andijanis to their west, the nomadic Turkic Kirghiz, the nomadic Mongol Qalmaq and the Han Chinese Khitay before they became known as Uyghurs. There was no single name used for their identity; various native names Altishahris used for identify were Altishahrlik (Altishahr person), yerlik (local), Turki and Musulmān (Muslim); the term Musulmān in this situation did not signify religious connotations, because the Altishahris exclude other Muslim peoples like the Kirghiz while identifying themselves as Musulmān. Dr. Laura J Newby says the sedentary Altishahri Turkic people considered themselves separate  from other Turkic Muslims since at least the 19th century.

The name "Uyghur" reappeared after the Soviet Union took the 9th-century ethnonym from the Uyghur Khaganate, then reapplied it to all non-nomadic Turkic Muslims of Xinjiang. It followed western European orientalists like Julius Klaproth in the 19th century who revived the name and spread the use of the term to local Turkic intellectuals and a 19th-century proposal from Russian historians that modern-day Uyghurs were descended from the Kingdom of Qocho and Kara-Khanid Khanate formed after the dissolution of the Uyghur Khaganate. Historians generally agree that the adoption of the term "Uyghur" is based on a decision from a 1921 conference in Tashkent, attended by Turkic Muslims from the Tarim Basin (Xinjiang). There, "Uyghur" was chosen by them as the name of their ethnicity, although delegates noted the modern groups referred to as "Uyghur" are distinct from the old Uyghur Khaganate. According to Linda Benson, the Soviets and their client Sheng Shicai intended to foster a Uyghur nationality to divide the Muslim population of Xinjiang, whereas the various Turkic Muslim peoples preferred to identify themselves as "Turki", "East Turkestani" or "Muslim".

On the other hand, the ruling regime of China at that time, the Kuomintang, grouped all Muslims, including the Turkic-speaking people of Xinjiang, into the "Hui nationality". The Qing dynasty and the Kuomintang generally referred to the sedentary oasis-dwelling Turkic Muslims of Xinjiang as "turban-headed Hui" to differentiate them from other predominantly Muslim ethnicities in China. In the 1930s, foreigners travelers in Xinjiang such as George W. Hunter, Peter Fleming, Ella Maillart and Sven Hedin, referred to the Turkic Muslims of the region as "Turki" in their books. Use of the term Uyghur was unknown in Xinjiang until 1934. The area governor, Sheng Shicai, came to power, adopting the Soviet ethnographic classification instead of the Kuomintang's and became the first to promulgate the official use of the term "Uyghur" to describe the Turkic Muslims of Xinjiang. "Uyghur" replaced "rag-head".

Sheng Shicai's introduction of the "Uighur" name for the Turkic people of Xinjiang was criticized and rejected by Turki intellectuals such as Pan-Turkist Jadids and East Turkestan independence activists Muhammad Amin Bughra (Mehmet Emin) and Masud Sabri. They demanded the names "Türk" or "Türki" be used instead as the ethnonyms for their people. Masud Sabri viewed the Hui people as Muslim Han Chinese and separate from his people, while Bughrain criticized Sheng for his designation of Turkic Muslims into different ethnicities which could sow disunion among Turkic Muslims. After the Communist victory, the Chinese Communist Party under Chairman Mao Zedong continued the Soviet classification, using the term "Uyghur" to describe the modern ethnicity.

In current usage, Uyghur refers to settled Turkic-speaking urban dwellers and farmers of the Tarim Basin and Ili who follow traditional Central Asian sedentary practices, as distinguished from nomadic Turkic populations in Central Asia. However, Chinese government agents designate as "Uyghur" certain peoples with significantly divergent histories and ancestries from the main group. These include the Lopliks of Ruoqiang County and the Dolan people, thought to be closer to the Oirat Mongols and the Kyrgyz. The use of the term Uyghur led to anachronisms when describing the history of the people. In one of his books, the term Uyghur was deliberately not used by James Millward.

Another ethnicity, the Western Yugur of Gansu, identify themselves as the "Yellow Uyghur" (Sarïq Uyghur). Some scholars say the Yugurs' culture, language and religion are closer to the original culture of the original Uyghur Karakorum state than is the culture of the modern Uyghur people of Xinjiang. Linguist and ethnographer S. Robert Ramsey argues for inclusion of both the Eastern and Western Yugur and the Salar as sub-groups of the Uyghur based on similar historical roots for the Yugur and on perceived linguistic similarities for the Salar.

"Turkistani is used as an alternate ethnonym by some Uyghurs. For example, the Uyghur diaspora in Arabia, adopted the identity "Turkistani". Some Uyghurs in Saudi Arabia adopted the Arabic nisba of their home city, such as "Al-Kashgari" from Kashgar. Saudi-born Uyghur Hamza Kashgari's family originated from Kashgar.

Population

The Uyghur population within China generally remains centered in Xinjiang region with some smaller subpopulations elsewhere in the country, such as in Taoyuan County where an estimated 5,000–10,000 live.

The size of the Uyghur population, particularly in China, has been the subject of dispute. Chinese authorities place the Uyghur population within the Xinjiang region to be just over 12 million, comprising approximately half of the total regional population. As early as 2003, however, some Uyghur groups wrote that their population was being vastly undercounted by Chinese authorities, claiming that their population actually exceeded 20 million. Population disputes have continued into the present, with some activists and groups such as the World Uyghur Congress and Uyghur American Association claiming that the Uyghur population ranges between 20 and 30 million. Some have even claimed that the real number of Uyghurs is actually 35 million. Scholars, however, have generally rejected these claims, with Professor Dru C. Gladney writing in the 2004 book Xinjiang: China's Muslim Borderland that there is "scant evidence" to support Uyghur claims that their population within China exceeds 20 million.

Population in Xinjiang

Genetics

A study of mitochondrial DNA (2004) (therefore the matrilineal genetic contribution) found the frequency of Western Eurasian-specific haplogroup in Uyghurs to be 42.6% and East Asian haplogroup to be 57.4%. Uyghurs in Kazakhstan on the other hand were shown to have 55% European/Western Eurasian maternal mtDNA.

A study based on paternal DNA (2005) shows West Eurasian haplogroups (J and R) in Uyghurs make up 65% to 70% and East Asian haplogroups (C, N, D and O) 30% to 35%.

One study by Xu et al. (2008), using samples from Hetian (Hotan) only, found Uyghurs have about an average of 60% European or West Asian (Western Eurasian) ancestry and about 40% East Asian or Siberian ancestry (Eastern Eurasian). From the same area, it is found that the proportion of Uyghur individuals with European/West Asian ancestry ranges individually from 40.3% to 84.3% while their East Asian/Siberian ancestry ranges individually from 15.7% to 59.7%. Further study by the same team showed an average of slightly greater European/West Asian component at 52% (ranging individually from 44.9% to 63.1%) in the Uyghur population in southern Xinjiang but only 47% (ranging individually from 30% to 55%) in the northern Uyghur population.

A different study by Li et al. (2009) used a larger sample of individuals from a wider area and found a higher East Asian component of about 70% on average, while the European/West Asian component was about 30%. Overall, Uyghur show relative more similarity to "Western East Asians" than to "Eastern East Asians". The authors also cite anthropologic studies which also estimate about 30% "Western proportions", which are in agreement with their genetic results.

A study (2013) based on autosomal DNA shows that average Uyghurs are closest to other Turkic people in Central Asia and China as well as various Chinese populations. The analysis of the diversity of cytochrome B further suggests Uyghurs are closer to Chinese and Siberian populations than to various Caucasoid groups in West Asia or Europe. However, there is significant genetic distance between the Xinjiang's southern Uyghurs and Chinese population, but not between the northern Uyghurs and Chinese.

A Study (2016) of Uyghur males living in southern Xinjiang used high-resolution 26 Y-STR loci system high-resolution to infer the genetic relationships between the Uyghur population and European and Asian populations. The results showed the Uyghur population of southern Xinjiang exhibited a genetic admixture of Eastern Asian and European populations but with slightly closer relationship with European populations than to Eastern Asian populations.

An extensive genome study in 2017 analyzed 951 samples of Uyghurs from 14 geographical subpopulations in Xinjiang and observed a southwest and northeast differentiation in the population, partially caused by the Tianshan Mountains which form a natural barrier, with gene flows from the east and west. The study identifies four major ancestral components that may have arisen from two earlier admixed groups: one West-Eurasian component, associated with European ancestry (25–37%), one South Asian ancestry component (12–20%), and two East-Eurasian components with Siberian (15–17%) and East Asian ancestries (29–47%). In total, Uyghurs on average range from 44 to 64% Siberian/East Asian, 33.2% European, and 17.9% South Asian. Western Xinjiang shows more West Eurasian components than East Asian. It suggests at least two major waves of admixture, one ~3,750 years ago coinciding with the age range of the mummies with European feature found in Xinjiang, and another occurring around 750 years ago.

A 2018 study of 206 Uyghur samples from Xinjiang, using the ancestry-informative SNP (AISNP) analysis, found that the average genetic ancestry of Uyghurs is 63.7% East Asian-related and 36.3% European-related.

History

The history of the Uyghur people, as with the ethnic origin of the people, is a matter of contention. Uyghur historians viewed the Uyghurs as the original inhabitants of Xinjiang with a long history. Uyghur politician and historian Muhammad Amin Bughra wrote in his book A History of East Turkestan, stressing the Turkic aspects of his people, that the Turks have a continuous 9000-year-old history, while historian Turghun Almas incorporated discoveries of Tarim mummies to conclude that Uyghurs have over 6400 years of continuous history, and the World Uyghur Congress claimed a 4,000-year history in East Turkestan. However, the official Chinese view, as documented in the white paper History and Development of Xinjiang, asserts that the Uyghur ethnic group formed after the collapse of the Uyghur Khaganate in 840, when the local residents of the Tarim Basin and its surrounding areas were merged with migrants from the khaganate.  The name "Uyghur" reappeared after the Soviet Union took the 9th-century ethnonym from the Uyghur Khaganate, then reapplied it to all non-nomadic Turkic Muslims of Xinjiang. Many contemporary Western scholars, however, do not consider the modern Uyghurs to be of direct linear descent from the old Uyghur Khaganate of Mongolia. Rather, they consider them to be descendants of a number of peoples, one of them the ancient Uyghurs.

Early history
Discovery of well-preserved Tarim mummies of a people European in appearance indicates the migration of a European-looking people into the Tarim area at the beginning of the Bronze Age around 1800 BC. These people may have been of Tocharian origin, and some have suggested them to be the Yuezhi mentioned in ancient Chinese texts. The Tocharians are thought to have developed from the Indo-European speaking Afanasevo culture of Southern Siberia (c. 3500–2500 BC). A study published in 2021 showed that the earliest Tarim Basin cultures had high levels of Ancient North Eurasian ancestry, with smaller admixture from Northeast Asians. Uyghur activist Turgun Almas claimed that Tarim mummies were Uyghurs because the earliest Uyghurs practiced shamanism and the buried mummies' orientation suggests that they had been shamanists; meanwhile, Qurban Wäli claimed words written in Kharosthi and Sogdian scripts as "Uyghur" rather than Sogdian words absorbed into Uyghur according to other linguists.

Later migrations brought peoples from the west and northwest to the Xinjiang region, probably speakers of various Iranian languages such as the Saka tribes, who were closely related to the European Scythians and descended from the earlier Andronovo culture, and who may have been present in the Khotan and Kashgar area in the first millennium BC, as well as the Sogdians who formed networks of trading communities across the Tarim Basin from the 4th century AD. There may also be an Indian component as the founding legend of Khotan suggests that the city was founded by Indians from ancient Taxila during the reign of Ashoka. Other people in the region mentioned in ancient Chinese texts include the Dingling as well as the Xiongnu who fought for supremacy in the region against the Chinese for several hundred years. Some Uyghur nationalists also claimed descent from the Xiongnu (according to the Chinese historical text the Book of Wei, the founder of the Uyghurs was descended from a Xiongnu ruler), but the view is contested by modern Chinese scholars.

The Yuezhi were driven away by the Xiongnu but founded the Kushan Empire, which exerted some influence in the Tarim Basin, where Kharosthi texts have been found in Loulan, Niya and Khotan. Loulan and Khotan were some of the many city-states that existed in the Xinjiang region during the Han Dynasty; others include Kucha, Turfan, Karasahr and Kashgar. These kingdoms in the Tarim Basin came under the control of China during the Han and Tang dynasties. During the Tang dynasty they were conquered and placed under the control of the Protectorate General to Pacify the West, and the Indo-European cultures of these kingdoms never recovered from Tang rule after thousands of their inhabitants were killed during the conquest. The settled population of these cities later merged with the  incoming Turkic people, including the Uyghurs of Uyghur Khaganate, to form the modern Uyghurs. The Indo-European Tocharian language later disappeared as the urban population switched to a Turkic language such as the Old Uyghur language.

The early Turkic peoples descended from agricultural communities in Northeast Asia who moved westwards into Mongolia in the late 3rd millennium BC, where they adopted a pastoral lifestyle. By the early 1st millennium BC, these peoples had become equestrian nomads. In subsequent centuries, the steppe populations of Central Asia appear to have been progressively Turkified by East Asian nomadic Turks, moving out of Mongolia.

Uyghur Khaganate (8th–9th centuries) 

The Uyghurs of the Uyghur Khaganate were part of a Turkic confederation called the Tiele, who lived in the valleys south of Lake Baikal and around the Yenisei River. They overthrew the First Turkic Khaganate and established the Uyghur Khaganate.

The Uyghur Khaganate lasted from 744 to 840. It was administered from the imperial capital Ordu-Baliq, one of the biggest ancient cities built in Mongolia. In 840, following a famine and civil war, the Uyghur Khaganate was overrun by the Yenisei Kirghiz, another Turkic people. As a result, the majority of tribal groups formerly under Uyghur control dispersed and moved out of Mongolia.

Uyghur kingdoms (9th–11th centuries)

The Uyghurs who founded the Uyghur Khaganate dispersed after the fall of the Khaganate, to live among the Karluks and to places such as Jimsar, Turpan and Gansu. These Uyghurs soon founded two kingdoms and the easternmost state was the Ganzhou Kingdom (870–1036) which ruled parts of Xinjiang, with its capital near present-day Zhangye, Gansu, China. The modern Yugurs are believed to be descendants of these Uyghurs. Ganzhou was absorbed by the Western Xia in 1036.

The second Uyghur kingdom, the Kingdom of Qocho ruled a larger section of Xinjiang, also known as Uyghuristan in its later period, was founded in the Turpan area with its capital in Qocho (modern Gaochang) and Beshbalik. The Kingdom of Qocho lasted from the ninth to the fourteenth century and proved to be longer-lasting than any power in the region, before or since. The Uyghurs were originally Tengrists, shamanists, and Manichaean, but converted to Buddhism during this period. Qocho accepted the Qara Khitai as its overlord in the 1130s, and in 1209 submitted voluntarily to the rising Mongol Empire. The Uyghurs of Kingdom of Qocho were allowed significant autonomy and played an important role as civil servants to the Mongol Empire, but was finally destroyed by the Chagatai Khanate by the end of the 14th century.

Islamization

In the tenth century, the Karluks, Yagmas, Chigils and other Turkic tribes founded the Kara-Khanid Khanate in Semirechye, Western Tian Shan, and Kashgaria and later conquered Transoxiana. The Karakhanid rulers were likely to be Yaghmas who were associated with the Toquz Oghuz and some historians therefore see this as a link between the Karakhanid and the Uyghurs of the Uyghur Khaganate, although this connection is disputed by others.

The Karakhanids converted to Islam in the tenth century beginning with Sultan Satuq Bughra Khan, the first Turkic dynasty to do so. Modern Uyghurs see the Muslim Karakhanids as an important part of their history; however, Islamization of the people of the Tarim Basin was a gradual process. The Indo-Iranian Saka Buddhist Kingdom of Khotan was conquered by the Turkic Muslim Karakhanids from Kashgar in the early 11th century, but Uyghur Qocho remained mainly Buddhist until the 15th century, and the conversion of the Uyghur people to Islam was not completed until the 17th century.

The 12th and 13th century saw the domination by non-Muslim powers: first the Kara-Khitans in the 12th century, followed by the Mongols in the 13th century. After the death of Genghis Khan in 1227, Transoxiana and Kashgar became the domain of his second son, Chagatai Khan. The Chagatai Khanate split into two in the 1340s, and the area of the Chagatai Khanate where the modern Uyghurs live became part of Moghulistan, which meant "land of the Mongols". In the 14th century, a Chagatayid khan Tughluq Temür converted to Islam, Genghisid Mongol nobilities also followed him to convert to Islam. His son Khizr Khoja conquered Qocho and Turfan (the core of Uyghuristan) in the 1390s, and the Uyghurs there became largely Muslim by the beginning of the 16th century. After being converted to Islam, the descendants of the previously Buddhist Uyghurs in Turfan failed to retain memory of their ancestral legacy and falsely believed that the "infidel Kalmuks" (Dzungars) were the ones who built Buddhist structures in their area.

From the late 14th through 17th centuries, the Xinjiang region became further subdivided into Moghulistan in the north, Altishahr (Kashgar and the Tarim Basin), and the Turfan area, each often ruled separately by competing Chagatayid descendants, the Dughlats, and later the Khojas.

Islam was also spread by the Sufis, and branches of its Naqshbandi order were the Khojas who seized control of political and military affairs in the Tarim Basin and Turfan in the 17th century. The Khojas however split into two rival factions, the Aqtaghlik Khojas (also called the Afaqiyya) and the Qarataghlik Khojas (the Ishaqiyya). The legacy of the Khojas lasted until the 19th century. The Qarataghlik Khojas seized power in Yarkand where the Chagatai Khans ruled in the Yarkent Khanate, forcing the Aqtaghlik Afaqi Khoja into exile.

Qing rule
In the 17th century, the Buddhist Dzungar Khanate grew in power in Dzungaria. The Dzungar conquest of Altishahr ended the last independent Chagatai Khanate, the Yarkent Khanate, after the Aqtaghlik Afaq Khoja sought aid from the 5th Dalai Lama and his Dzungar Buddhist followers to help him in his struggle against the Qarataghlik Khojas. The Aqtaghlik Khojas in the Tarim Basin then became vassals to the Dzungars.

The expansion of the Dzungars into Khalkha Mongol territory in Mongolia brought them into direct conflict with Qing China in the late 17th century, and in the process also brought Chinese presence back into the region a thousand years after Tang China lost control of the Western Regions.

The Dzungar–Qing War lasted a decade. During the Dzungar conflict, two Aqtaghlik brothers, the so-called "Younger Khoja", also known as Khwāja-i Jahān, and his sibling, the Elder Khoja, also known as Burhān al-Dīn, after being appointed as vassals in the Tarim Basin by the Dzungars, first joined the Qing and rebelled against Dzungar rule until the final Qing victory over the Dzungars, then they rebelled against the Qing, an action which prompted the invasion and conquest of the Tarim Basin by the Qing in 1759. The Uyghurs of Turfan and Hami such as Emin Khoja were allies of the Qing in this conflict, and these Uyghurs also helped the Qing rule the Altishahr Uyghurs in the Tarim Basin.

The final campaign against the Dzungars in the 1750s ended with the Dzungar genocide. The Qing "final solution" of genocide to solve the problem of the Dzungar Mongols created a land devoid of Dzungars, which was followed by the Qing sponsored settlement of millions of other people in Dzungaria. In northern Xinjiang, the Qing brought in Han, Hui, Uyghur, Xibe, Daurs, Solons, Turkic Muslim Taranchis and Kazakh colonists, with one third of Xinjiang's total population consisting of Hui and Han in the northern area, while around two thirds were Uyghurs in southern Xinjiang's Tarim Basin. In Dzungaria, the Qing established new cities like Ürümqi and Yining. The Dzungarian basin itself is now inhabited by many Kazakhs. The Qing therefore unified Xinjiang and changed its demographic composition as well. The crushing of the Buddhist Dzungars by the Qing led to the empowerment of the Muslim Begs in southern Xinjiang, migration of Muslim Taranchis to northern Xinjiang, and increasing Turkic Muslim power, with Turkic Muslim culture and identity was tolerated or even promoted by the Qing. It was therefore argued by Henry Schwarz that "the Qing victory was, in a certain sense, a victory for Islam".

In Beijing, a community of Uyghurs was clustered around the mosque near the Forbidden City, having moved to Beijing in the 18th century.

The Ush rebellion in 1765 by Uyghurs against the Manchus occurred after several incidents of misrule and abuse that had caused considerable anger and resentment. The Manchu Emperor ordered that the Uyghur rebel town be massacred, and the men were executed and the women and children enslaved.

Yettishar
During the Dungan Revolt (1862–1877), Andijani Uzbeks from the Khanate of Kokand under Buzurg Khan and Yaqub Beg expelled Qing officials from parts of southern Xinjiang and founded an independent Kashgarian kingdom called Yettishar ("Country of Seven Cities"). Under the leadership of Yaqub Beg, it included Kashgar, Yarkand, Khotan, Aksu, Kucha, Korla, and Turpan. Large Qing dynasty forces under Chinese General Zuo Zongtang attacked Yettishar in 1876.

Qing reconquest
After this invasion, the two regions of Dzungaria, which had been known as the Dzungar region or the Northern marches of the Tian Shan, and the Tarim Basin, which had been known as "Muslim land" or southern marches of the Tian Shan, were reorganized into a province named Xinjiang, meaning "New Territory".

First East Turkestan Republic
In 1912, the Qing Dynasty was replaced by the Republic of China. By 1920, Pan-Turkic Jadidists had become a challenge to Chinese warlord Yang Zengxin, who controlled Xinjiang. Uyghurs staged several uprisings against Chinese rule. In 1931, the Kumul Rebellion erupted, leading to the establishment of an independent government in Khotan in 1932, which later led to the creation of the First East Turkestan Republic, officially known as the Turkish Islamic Republic of East Turkestan. Uyghurs joined with Uzbeks, Kazakhs, and Kyrgyz and successfully declared their independence on 12 November 1933. The First East Turkestan Republic was a short-lived attempt at independence around the areas encompassing Kashgar, Yarkent, and Khotan, and it was attacked during the Qumul Rebellion by a Chinese Muslim army under General Ma Zhancang and Ma Fuyuan and fell following the Battle of Kashgar (1934). The Soviets backed Chinese warlord Sheng Shicai's rule over East Turkestan/Xinjiang from 1934 to 1943. In April 1937, remnants of the First East Turkestan Republic launched an uprising known as the Islamic Rebellion in Xinjiang and briefly established an independent government, controlling areas from Atush, Kashgar, Yarkent, and even parts of Khotan, before it was crushed in October 1937, following Soviet intervention. Sheng Shicai purged 50,000 to 100,000 people, mostly Uyghurs, following this uprising.

Second East Turkestan Republic
The oppressive reign of Sheng Shicai fueled discontent by Uyghur and other Turkic peoples of the region, and Sheng expelled Soviet advisors following U.S. support for the Kuomintang of the Republic of China. This led the Soviets to capitalize on the Uyghur and other Turkic people's discontent in the region, culminating in their support of the Ili Rebellion in October 1944. The Ili Rebellion resulted in the establishment of the Second East Turkestan Republic on 12 November 1944, in the three districts of what is now the Ili Kazakh Autonomous Prefecture. Several pro-KMT Uyghurs like Isa Yusuf Alptekin, Memet Emin Bugra, and Mesut Sabri opposed the Second East Turkestan Republic and supported the Republic of China. In the summer of 1949, the Soviets purged the thirty top leaders of the Second East Turkestan Republic and its five top officials died in a mysterious plane crash on 27 August 1949. On 13 October 1949, the People's Liberation Army entered the region and the East Turkestan National Army was merged into the PLA's 5th Army Corps, leading to the official end of the Second East Turkestan Republic on 22 December 1949.

Contemporary era

Mao declared the founding of the People's Republic of China on 1 October 1949. He turned the Second East Turkistan Republic into the Ili Kazakh Autonomous Prefecture, and appointed Saifuddin Azizi as the region's first Communist Party governor. Many Republican loyalists fled into exile in Turkey and Western countries. The name Xinjiang was changed to Xinjiang Uyghur Autonomous Region, where Uyghurs are the largest ethnicity, mostly concentrated in the south-western Xinjiang.

The Xinjiang conflict is an ongoing separatist conflict in China's far-west province of Xinjiang, whose northern region is known as Dzungaria and whose southern region (the Tarim Basin) is known as East Turkestan. Uyghur separatists and independence movements claim that the Second East Turkestan Republic was illegally incorporated by China in 1949 and has since been under Chinese occupation.
Uyghur identity remains fragmented, as some support a Pan-Islamic vision, exemplified by the East Turkestan Islamic Movement, while others support a Pan-Turkic vision, such as the East Turkestan Liberation Organization. A third group would like an East Turkestan state, such as the East Turkestan independence movement. While the East Turkistan Government in Exile strives for the restoration of East Turkistan's independence as a secular pluralistic Republic that guarantees freedom and civil liberties for all people. As a result, "[n]o Uyghur or East Turkestan group speaks for all Uyghurs, although it might claim to", and Uyghurs in each of these camps have committed violence against other Uyghurs who they think are too assimilated to Chinese or Russian society or are not religious enough. Mindful not to take sides, Uyghur "leaders" such as Rebiya Kadeer mainly tried to garner international support for the "rights and interests of the Uyghurs", including the right to demonstrate, although the Chinese government has accused her of orchestrating the deadly July 2009 Ürümqi riots.

Eric Enno Tamm's 2011 book states that, "Authorities have censored Uyghur writers and 'lavished funds' on official histories that depict Chinese territorial expansion into ethnic borderlands as 'unifications (tongyi), never as conquests (zhengfu) or annexations (tunbing)' "

Human rights abuses against Uyghurs in Xinjiang

Since 2014, Uyghurs in Xinjiang have been affected by extensive controls and restrictions which the Chinese government has imposed upon their religious, cultural, economic and social lives. In Xinjiang, the Chinese government has expanded police surveillance to watch for signs of "religious extremism" that include owning books about Uyghurs, growing a beard, having a prayer rug, or quitting smoking or drinking. The government had also installed cameras in the homes of private citizens.

Further, at least 120,000 (and possibly over 1 million) Uyghurs have been detained in mass detention camps, termed "re-education camps", aimed at changing the political thinking of detainees, their identities, and their religious beliefs. Some of these facilities keep prisoners detained around the clock, while others release their inmates at night to return home. According to Chinese government operating procedures, the main feature of the camps is to ensure adherence to Chinese Communist Party ideology. Inmates are continuously held captive in the camps for a minimum of 12 months depending on their performance on Chinese ideology tests. The New York Times has reported inmates are required to "sing hymns praising the Chinese Communist Party and write 'self-criticism' essays," and that prisoners are also subjected to physical and verbal abuse by prison guards. Chinese officials are sometimes assigned to monitor the families of current inmates, and women have been detained due to actions by their sons or husbands.

In 2017, Human Rights Watch released a report saying "The Chinese government agents should immediately free people held in unlawful 'political education' centers in Xinjiang, and shut them down." The internment, along with mass surveillance and intelligence officials inserting themselves into Uyghur families, led to widespread accusations of cultural genocide against the CCP. In particular, the size of the operation was found to have doubled over 2018. Satellite evidence suggests China destroyed more than two dozen Uyghur Muslim religious sites between 2016 and 2018.

The government denied the existence of the camps initially, but then changed their stance to claim that the camps serve to combat terrorism and give vocational training to the Uyghur people. Activists have called for the camps to be opened to visitors to prove their function. Media groups have reported that many in the camps were forcibly detained there in rough unhygienic conditions while undergoing political indoctrination. The lengthy isolation periods between Uyghur men and women has been interpreted by some analysts as an attempt to inhibit Uyghur procreation in order to change the ethnic demographics of the country.

An October 2018 exposé by the BBC claimed, based on analysis of satellite imagery collected over time, that hundreds of thousands of Uyghurs were interned in rapidly expanding camps. It was also reported in 2019 that "hundreds" of writers, artists, and academics had been imprisoned, in what the magazine qualified as an attempt to "punish any form of religious or cultural expression" among Uyghurs.

Parallel to the forceful detainment of millions of adults, in 2017 alone at least half a million children were also forcefully separated from their families, and placed in pre-school camps with prison-style surveillance systems and 10,000 volt electric fences.

In 2019, a New York Times article reported that human rights groups and Uyghur activists said that the Chinese government was using technology from US companies and researchers to collect DNA from Uyghurs. They said China was building a comprehensive DNA database to be able to track down Uyghurs who were resisting the re-education campaign. Later that year, satellite photos confirmed the systematic destruction of Uyghur cemeteries.

There have been few sustained protests from Islamic countries against the treatment of Uyghurs in China. In December 2018, the Organization of Islamic Cooperation (OIC) initially acknowledged the disturbing reports from the region but it later issued a report saying that the OIC "commends the efforts of the People's Republic of China in providing care to its Muslim citizens; and looks forward to further cooperation between the OIC and the People's Republic of China." Saudi Arabia, which hosts a significant number of ethnic Uyghurs, have refrained from any official criticism of the Chinese government, while Turkey's President Erdogan tacitly supported China saying that "It is a fact that the people of all ethnicities in Xinjiang are leading a happy life amid China's development and prosperity" while visiting China, after its Foreign Ministry denounced China for "violating the fundamental human rights of Uyghur Turks". In 2019, Indonesian scholar Said Aqil Siradj said the situation in Xinjiang was "really good" and suggested that the Indonesian government did not need to follow the Western countries in raising accusations of Uyghur persecution at international forums. Some observers have connected the lack of criticism from the Islamic world to Muslim countries' dependence on Chinese economic aid.

In July 2019, 22 countries, including Australia, the United Kingdom, Canada, France, Germany and Japan, raised concerns about “large-scale places of detention, as well as widespread surveillance and restrictions, particularly targeting Uyghurs and other minorities in Xinjiang”. The 22 ambassadors urged China to end arbitrary detention and allow “freedom of movement of Uyghurs and other Muslim and minority communities in Xinjiang”. However, none of these countries were predominantly Islamic countries. In June 2020, former United States President Donald Trump signed the Uyghur Human Rights Policy Act, which authorizes the imposition of U.S. sanctions against Chinese government officials responsible for re-education camps.

On 12 July 2019, ambassadors from 50 countries issued a joint letter to the President of the UN Human Rights Council and the UN High Commissioner for Human Rights showing their support for China, despite condemnation by several states over the detention of as many as two million Uyghur Muslims. These countries included mainly countries in Asia, Africa and the Middle East. On 20 August 2019, Qatar withdrew its signature from the letter, ending its support for China over its treatment of Muslims.

According to a 2020 report by the Australian Strategic Policy Institute (ASPI), several Chinese firms were benefitting from the forced labor of Uyghurs, where more than 80 companies across the world were "directly or indirectly benefiting from the use of Uyghur workers outside Xinjiang through abusive labor transfer programs". While the United States and the United Kingdom had imposed restrictions on imports of cotton and other products from China, Japan was pressured to take action, and 12 major Japanese firms established a policy to cease business with the Chinese firms indicated by the ASPI to be using forced labor of Uyghurs.

In June 2020, German anthropologist Adrian Zenz, released a report alleging that Uyghur women, under the threat of internment, were being forced to abort children, undergo sterilization surgery, and be fitted with intrauterine devices. The report revealed that growth rates in Xinjiang had declined 60% between 2015 and 2018, with the two largest Uyghur prefectures declining 84% in that same time period. The birth rate declined a further 24% across the region in 2019 alone compared to the 4.2% drop across all of China in the same year. The report also noted that in 2014, 2.5% of new IUD placements throughout the country were in Xinjiang. By 2018, 80% of new IUD placements were in Xinjiang despite the region comprising 1.8% of the national population. Zenz said that these efforts by China to repress the Uyghur birth rate met the criteria of genocide under Article II, Section D of the United Nations Genocide Convention by "imposing measures intended to prevent births within the group." The measures have also been compared to China's past one-child policy targeting its Han population. Pundits from Pakistan Observer, Antara, and Detik.com disagreed with allegations of lowered Uyghur births, claiming their birth rate was higher than in earlier years and higher than the Han birth rate.

On July 6, 2020, the East Turkistan Government in Exile and the East Turkistan National Awakening Movement filed a complaint with the International Criminal Court (ICC), urging it to investigate and prosecute PRC officials for genocide and other crimes against humanity.

On 13 July 2020, China decided to take reciprocal measures against US officials and announced sanctions on US lawmakers and an envoy over the issue of Uyghur rights in Xinjiang.

In October 2020, 39 countries condemned China's human rights abuses against Uyghurs. Diplomats said some other countries were pressured by China not to join the other 39 countries condemning China's actions. Conversely, 54 countries have voiced their support for China, including North Korea,  though one notable country not on either list is South Korea, who has looked to gain political autonomy in recent years by remaining neutral on key contentious issues.

In January 2021, British Foreign Secretary Dominic Raab said that China's treatment of Uyghurs amounts to torture. That same month, the U.S. government declared it a genocide.

On 8 March 2021, the US-based nonpartisan think tank Newlines Institute released what was in their words "the first independent expert application of the 1948 Genocide Convention to the ongoing treatment of the Uyghurs in China." The report concluded "that China is responsible for breaches of each provision of Article II of the Convention" and "bears State responsibility for an ongoing genocide against the Uyghurs, in breach of the Genocide Convention."

In April 2021, Human Rights Watch released a report that labelled the treatment of Uyghurs by the Chinese government as "crimes against humanity".

The treament of Uyghur Muslims in China has resulted in citizens of the ethnic minority group to seek asylum in other nations. A large number of these people chose to confide in the Muslim-majority nations like the United Arab Emirates, Saudi Arabia and Egypt. However, having good ties with China, these countries began detaining and deporting the Uyghur Muslims back to China. Authorities in Dubai and other Islamic countries received extradition requests from Beijing, as per which many exiled Uyghurs were detained, separated from their families and deported to China. Concerns were raised that while western countries like the US were calling it a “genocide”, the Muslim-majority countries like the Emirates were ignoring the issue and rather deporting the Uyghurs to China. The Arab nations were focused on the crucial economic ties they maintained with China, which is a primary consumer of Middle East oil and a crucial trading and investment partner for these countries.

On 30 June 2021, a Han Chinese woman, Wu Huan, who was on the run to avoid extradition to China because her fiancé was considered a Chinese dissident, said in an interview that China has a secret jail in Dubai. According to Wu, she was abducted from a hotel in Dubai in late May and detained by Chinese officials for eight days at a villa converted into a jail, where she saw or heard two other prisoners, both Uyghurs. According to Wu, she identified the women as Uyghurs based on what she said was their distinctive appearance and accent. Dubai police denied the presence of any foreign government run detention centers within its borders.

In August 2022, the United Nations released a report alleging that China’s crackdown in Xinjiang may amount to crimes against humanity against the Uyghurs, which included physical and mental torture, forced labor, massive displacement, enforced sterilization and separation of children from their parents. The report was criticized by some activists for not calling the crimes a genocide. Many Uyghurs outside China saw it as a formal acknowledgement of the sufferings of Uyghurs in China, hoping it will add fuel to their campaign at the international level.

Uyghurs of Taoyuan, Hunan 
Around 5,000 Uyghurs live around Taoyuan County and other parts of Changde in Hunan province. They are descended from Hala Bashi, a Uyghur leader from Turpan (Kingdom of Qocho), and his Uyghur soldiers sent to Hunan by the Ming Emperor in the 14th century to crush the Miao rebels during the Miao Rebellions in the Ming Dynasty. The 1982 census recorded 4,000 Uyghurs in Hunan. They have genealogies which survive 600 years later to the present day. Genealogy keeping is a Han Chinese custom which the Hunan Uyghurs adopted. These Uyghurs were given the surname Jian by the Emperor. There is some confusion as to whether they practice Islam or not. Some say that they have assimilated with the Han and do not practice Islam anymore and only their genealogies indicate their Uyghur ancestry. Chinese news sources report that they are Muslim.

The Uyghur troops led by Hala were ordered by the Ming Emperor to crush Miao rebellions and were given titles by him. Jian is the predominant surname among the Uyghur in Changde, Hunan. Another group of Uyghur have the surname Sai. Hui and Uyghur have intermarried in the Hunan area. The Hui are descendants of Arabs and Han Chinese who intermarried and they share the Islamic religion with the Uyghur in Hunan. It is reported that they now number around 10,000 people. The Uyghurs in Changde are not very religious and eat pork. Older Uyghurs disapprove of this, especially elders at the mosques in Changde and they seek to draw them back to Islamic customs.

In addition to eating pork, the Uyghurs of Changde Hunan practice other Han Chinese customs, like ancestor worship at graves. Some Uyghurs from Xinjiang visit the Hunan Uyghurs out of curiosity or interest. Also, the Uyghurs of Hunan do not speak the Uyghur language, instead, they speak Chinese as their native language and Arabic for religious reasons at the mosque.

Culture

Religion

The ancient Uyghurs believed in many local deities. These practices gave rise to shamanism and Tengrism. Uyghurs also practiced aspects of Zoroastrianism such as fire altars, and adopted Manichaeism as a state religion for the Uyghur Khaganate, possibly in 762 or 763. Ancient Uyghurs also practiced Buddhism after they moved to Qocho, and some believed in Church of the East.

People in the Western Tarim Basin region began their conversion to Islam early in the Kara-Khanid Khanate period.  Some pre-Islamic practices continued under Muslim rule; for example, while the Quran dictated many rules on marriage and divorce, other pre-Islamic principles based on Zoroastrianism also helped shape the laws of the land. There had been Christian conversions in the late 19th and early 20th centuries, but these were suppressed by the First East Turkestan Republic government agents. Because of persecution the churches were destroyed and the believers were scattered. According to the national census, 0.5% or 1,142 Uyghurs in Kazakhstan were Christians in 2009.

Modern Uyghurs are primarily Muslim and they are the second-largest predominantly Muslim ethnicity in China after the Hui. The majority of modern Uyghurs are Sunnis, although additional conflicts exist between Sufi and non-Sufi religious orders. While modern Uyghurs consider Islam to be part of their identity, religious observance varies between different regions. In general, Muslims in the southern region, Kashgar in particular, are more conservative. For example, women wearing the veil (a piece of cloth covering the head completely) are more common in Kashgar than some other cities. The veil, however, has been banned in some cities since 2014 after it became more popular. 

There is also a general split between the Uyghurs and the Hui Muslims in Xinjiang and they normally worship in different mosques. The Chinese government discourages religious worship among the Uyghurs, and there is evidence of thousands of Uyghur mosques including historic ones being destroyed. According to a 2020 report by the Australian Strategic Policy Institute, since 2017, Chinese authorities have destroyed or damaged 16,000 mosques in Xinjiang.

In the early 21st century a new trend of Islam, Salafism, emerged in Xinjiang, mostly among the Turkic population including Uyghurs, although there are Hui Salafis. These Salafis tend to demonstrate pan-Islamism and abandoned nationalism in favor of a desired caliphate to rule Xinjiang in the event of independence from China. Many Uyghur Salafis have allied themselves with the Turkistan Islamic Party in response to growing repression of Uyghurs by China.

Language

The ancient people of the Tarim Basin originally spoke different languages, such as Tocharian, Saka (Khotanese), and Gandhari. The Turkic people who moved into the region in the 9th century brought with them their languages, which slowly supplanted the original tongues of the local inhabitants. In the 11th century Mahmud al-Kashgari noted that the Uyghurs (of Qocho) spoke a pure Turkic language, but they also still spoke another language among themselves and had two different scripts. He also noted that the people of Khotan did not know Turkic well and had their own language and script (Khotanese). Writers of the Karakhanid period, Al-Kashgari and Yusuf Balasagun, referred to their Turkic language as Khāqāniyya (meaning royal) or the "language of Kashgar" or simply Turkic.

The modern Uyghur language is classified under the Karluk branch of the Turkic language family. It is closely related to Äynu, Lop, Ili Turki and Chagatay (the East Karluk languages) and slightly less closely to Uzbek (which is West Karluk). The Uyghur language is an agglutinative language and has a subject-object-verb word order. It has vowel harmony like other Turkic languages and has noun and verb cases but lacks distinction of gender forms.

Modern Uyghurs have adopted a number of scripts for their language. The Arabic script, known as the Chagatay alphabet, was adopted along with Islam. This alphabet is known as Kona Yëziq (old script). Political changes in the 20th century led to numerous reforms of the scripts, for example the Cyrillic-based Uyghur Cyrillic alphabet, a Latin Uyghur New Script and later a reformed Uyghur Arabic alphabet, which represents all vowels, unlike Kona Yëziq. A new Latin version, the Uyghur Latin alphabet, was also devised in the 21st century.

In the 1990s many Uyghurs in parts of Xinjiang could not speak Mandarin Chinese.

Literature

The literary works of the ancient Uyghurs were mostly translations of Buddhist and Manichaean religious texts, but there were also narrative, poetic and epic works apparently original to the Uyghurs. However it is the literature of the Kara-Khanid period that is considered by modern Uyghurs to be the important part of their literary traditions. Amongst these are Islamic religious texts and histories of Turkic peoples, and important works surviving from that era are Kutadgu Bilig, "Wisdom of Royal Glory" by Yusuf Khass Hajib (1069–70), Mahmud al-Kashgari's Dīwānu l-Luġat al-Turk, "A Dictionary of Turkic Dialects" (1072) and Ehmed Yükneki's Etebetulheqayiq. Modern Uyghur religious literature includes the Taẕkirah, biographies of Islamic religious figures and saints. The Turki language Tadhkirah i Khwajagan was written by M. Sadiq Kashghari. Between the 1600s and 1900s many Turki-language tazkirah manuscripts devoted to stories of local sultans, martyrs and saints were written. Perhaps the most famous and best-loved pieces of modern Uyghur literature are Abdurehim Ötkür's Iz, Oyghanghan Zimin, Zordun Sabir's Anayurt and Ziya Samedi's novels Mayimkhan and Mystery of the years.

Exiled Uyghur writers and poets, such as Muyesser Abdul'ehed, use literature to highlight the issues facing their community.

Music

Muqam is the classical musical style. The 12 Muqams are the national oral epic of the Uyghurs. The muqam system was developed among the Uyghur in northwestern China and Central Asia over approximately the last 1500 years from the Arabic maqamat modal system that has led to many musical genres among peoples of Eurasia and North Africa. Uyghurs have local muqam systems named after the oasis towns of Xinjiang, such as Dolan, Ili, Kumul and Turpan. The most fully developed at this point is the Western Tarim region's 12 muqams, which are now a large canon of music and songs recorded by the traditional performers Turdi Akhun and Omar Akhun among others in the 1950s and edited into a more systematic system. Although the folk performers probably improvized their songs, as in Turkish taksim performances, the present institutional canon is performed as fixed compositions by ensembles.

The Uyghur Muqam of Xinjiang has been designated by UNESCO as part of the Intangible Heritage of Humanity.

Amannisa Khan, sometimes called Amanni Shahan (1526–1560), is credited with collecting and thereby preserving the Twelve Muqam. Russian scholar Pantusov writes that the Uyghurs manufactured their own musical instruments, they had 62 different kinds of musical instruments, and in every Uyghur home there used to be an instrument called a "duttar".

Uzbek composer Shakhida Shaimardanova uses themes from Uyghur folk music in her compositions.

Dance

Sanam is a popular folk dance among the Uyghur people. It is commonly danced by people at weddings, festive occasions, and parties. The dance may be performed with singing and musical accompaniment. Sama is a form of group dance for Newruz (New Year) and other festivals. Other dances include the Dolan dances, Shadiyane, and Nazirkom. Some dances may alternate between singing and dancing, and Uyghur hand-drums called dap are commonly used as accompaniment for Uyghur dances.

Art

During the late-19th and early-20th centuries, scientific and archaeological expeditions to the region of Xinjiang's Silk Road discovered numerous cave temples, monastery ruins, and wall paintings, as well as miniatures, books, and documents. There are 77 rock-cut caves at the site. Most have rectangular spaces with rounded arch ceilings often divided into four sections, each with a mural of Buddha. The effect is of an entire ceiling covered with hundreds of Buddha murals. Some ceilings are painted with a large Buddha surrounded by other figures, including Indians, Persians and Europeans. The quality of the murals vary with some being artistically naïve while others are masterpieces of religious art.

Education
Historically, the education level of Old Uyghur people was higher than the other ethnicities around them. The Buddhist Uyghurs of Qocho became the civil servants of Mongol Empire and Old Uyghur Buddhists enjoyed a high status in the Mongol empire. They also introduced the written script for the Mongolian language. In the Islamic era, education was provided by the mosques and madrassas. During the Qing era, Chinese Confucian schools were also set up in Xinjiang and in the late 19th century Christian missionary schools.

In the late nineteenth and early 20th century, school were often located in mosques and madrassas. Mosques ran informal schools, known as mektep or maktab, attached to the mosques, The maktab provided most of the education and its curriculum was primarily religious and oral. Boys and girls might be taught in separate schools, some of which offered modern secular subjects in the early 20th century. In madrasas, poetry, logic, Arabic grammar and Islamic law were taught. In the early 20th century, the Jadidists Turkic Muslims from Russia spread new ideas on education and popularized the identity of "Turkestani".

In more recent times, religious education is highly restricted in Xinjiang and the Chinese authority had sought to eradicate any religious school they considered illegal. Although Islamic private schools (Sino-Arabic schools) have been supported and permitted by the Chinese government among Hui Muslim areas since the 1980s, this policy does not extend to schools in Xinjiang due to fear of separatism.

Beginning in the early 20th century, secular education became more widespread. Early in the communist era, Uyghurs had a choice of two separate secular school systems, one conducted in their own language and one offering instructions only in Chinese. Many Uyghurs linked the preservation of their cultural and religious identity with the language of instruction in schools and therefore preferred the Uyghur language school. However, from the mid-1980s onward, the Chinese government began to reduce teaching in Uyghur and starting mid-1990s also began to merge some schools from the two systems. By 2002, Xinjiang University, originally a bilingual institution, had ceased offering courses in the Uyghur language. From 2004 onward, the government policy has been that classes should be conducted in Chinese as much as possible and in some selected regions, instruction in Chinese began in the first grade. A special senior-secondary boarding school program for Uyghurs, the Xinjiang Class, with course work conducted entirely in Chinese was also established in 2000. Many schools have also moved toward using mainly Chinese in the 2010s, with teaching in the Uyghur language limited to only a few hours a week. The level of educational attainment among Uyghurs is generally lower than that of the Han Chinese; this may be due to the cost of education, the lack of proficiency in the Chinese language (now the main medium of instruction) among many Uyghurs, and poorer employment prospects for Uyghur graduates due to job discrimination in favor of Han Chinese. Uyghurs in China, unlike the Hui and Salar who are also mostly Muslim, generally do not oppose coeducation, however girls may be withdrawn from school earlier than boys.

Traditional medicine
Uyghur traditional medicine is known as Unani (طب یونانی), as historically used in the Mughal Empire. Sir Percy Sykes described the medicine as "based on the ancient Greek theory" and mentioned how ailments and sicknesses were treated in Through Deserts and Oases of Central Asia. Today, traditional medicine can still be found at street stands. Similar to other traditional medicine, diagnosis is usually made through checking the pulse, symptoms and disease history and then the pharmacist pounds up different dried herbs, making personalized medicines according to the prescription. Modern Uyghur medical hospitals adopted modern medical science and medicine and applied evidence-based pharmaceutical technology to traditional medicines. Historically, Uyghur medical knowledge has contributed to Chinese medicine in terms of medical treatments, medicinal materials and ingredients and symptom detection.

Cuisine

Uyghur food shows both Central Asian and Chinese elements. A typical Uyghur dish is polu (or pilaf), a dish found throughout Central Asia. In a common version of the Uyghur polu, carrots and mutton (or chicken) are first fried in oil with onions, then rice and water are added and the whole dish is steamed. Raisins and dried apricots may also be added. Kawaplar or chuanr (i.e., kebabs or grilled meat) are also found here. Another common Uyghur dish is leghmen, a noodle dish with a stir-fried topping (säy, from Chinese cai) usually made from mutton and vegetables, such as tomatoes, onions, green bell peppers, chili peppers and cabbage. This dish is likely to have originated from the Chinese lamian, but its flavor and preparation method are distinctively Uyghur.

Uyghur food is characterized by mutton, beef, camel (solely bactrian), chicken, goose, carrots, tomatoes, onions, peppers, eggplant, celery, various dairy foods and fruits.

A Uyghur-style breakfast consists of tea with home-baked bread, hardened yogurt, olives, honey, raisins and almonds. Uyghurs like to treat guests with tea, naan and fruit before the main dishes are ready.

Sangza are crispy fried wheat flour dough twists, a holiday specialty. Samsa are lamb pies baked in a special brick oven. Youtazi is steamed multi-layer bread. Göshnan are pan-grilled lamb pies. Pamirdin are baked pies stuffed with lamb, carrots and onions. Shorpa is lamb soup. Other dishes include Toghach (a type of tandoor bread) and Tunurkawab. Girde is also a very popular bagel-like bread with a hard and crispy crust that is soft inside.

A cake sold by Uyghurs is the traditional Uyghur nut cake.

Clothing

Chapan, a coat, and doppa, a type of hat for men, is commonly worn by Uyghurs. Another type of headwear, salwa telpek (salwa tälpäk, салва тәлпәк), is also worn by Uyghurs.

In the early 20th century, face covering veils with velvet caps trimmed with otter fur were worn in the streets by Turki women in public in Xinjiang as witnessed by the adventurer Ahmad Kamal in the 1930s. Travelers of the period Sir Percy Sykes and Ella Sykes wrote that in Kashghar women went into the bazar "transacting business with their veils thrown back" but mullahs tried to enforce veil wearing and were "in the habit of beating those who show their face in the Great Bazar". In that period, belonging to different social statuses meant a difference in how rigorously the veil was worn.

Muslim Turkestani men traditionally cut all the hair off their head. Sir Aurel Stein observed that the "Turki Muhammadan, accustomed to shelter this shaven head under a substantial fur-cap when the temperature is so low as it was just then". No hair cutting for men took place on the ajuz ayyam, days of the year that were considered inauspicious.

Traditional handicrafts
Yengisar is famous for manufacturing Uyghur handcrafted knives. The Uyghur word for knife is pichaq and the word for knifemaking (cutler) is pichaqchiliq. Uyghur artisan craftsmen in Yengisar are known for their knife manufacture. Uyghur men carry such knives as part of their culture to demonstrate the masculinity of the wearer, but it has also led to ethnic tension. Limitations were placed on knife vending due to concerns over terrorism and violent assaults.

Livelihood 

Most Uyghurs are agriculturists. Cultivating crops in an arid region has made the Uyghurs excel in irrigation techniques. This includes the construction and maintenance of underground channels called karez that brings water from the mountains to their fields. A few of the well-known agricultural goods include apples (especially from Ghulja), sweet melons (from Hami), and grapes from Turpan. However, many Uyghurs are also employed in the mining, manufacturing, cotton, and petrochemical industries. Local handicrafts like rug-weaving and jade-carving are also important to the cottage industry of the Uyghurs.

Some Uyghurs have been given jobs through Chinese government affirmative action programs. Uyghurs may also have difficulty receiving non-interest loans (per Islamic beliefs). The general lack of Uyghur proficiency in Mandarin Chinese also creates a barrier to access private and public sector jobs.

Names
Since the arrival of Islam most Uyghurs have used "Arabic names", but traditional Uyghur names and names of other origin are still used by some. After the establishment of the Soviet Union, many Uyghurs who studied in Soviet Central Asia added Russian suffixes to Russify their surnames. Names from Russia and Europe are used in Qaramay and Ürümqi by part of the population of city-dwelling Uyghurs. Others use names with hard-to-understand etymologies, with the majority dating from the Islamic era and being of Arabic or Persian derivation.  Some pre-Islamic Uyghur names are preserved in Turpan and Qumul. The government has banned some two dozen Islamic names.

See also 

East Turkistan Organization
Eretnids
Hui-Uyghur tension
List of Uyghurs
Meshrep
Tibetan Muslims
Turkistan Islamic Party
Turkistan Islamic Party in Syria
Uyghur genocide
Uyghur timeline
Uyghurs in Beijing
Xinjiang conflict

Explanatory notes

References

Citations

General and cited sources 

 
 
 
 
 
 
 
 
 
 
 
 
 
 
 
 
 
 

 Attribution

Further reading 

 Chinese Cultural Studies: Ethnography of China: Brief Guide acc6.its.brooklyn.cuny.edu
 Beckwith, Christopher I. (2009). Empires of the Silk Road: A History of Central Eurasia from the Bronze Age to the Present. Princeton University Press. .
 
 
 
 
 Findley, Carter Vaughn. 2005. The Turks in World History. Oxford University Press. ,  (pbk.)
 
 Hessler, Peter. Oracle Bones: A Journey Through Time in China. New York: Harper Perennial, 2006.
 
 Human Rights in China: China, Minority Exclusion, Marginalization and Rising Tensions, London, Minority Rights Group International, 2007
 
 Kamberi, Dolkun. 2005. Uyghurs and Uyghur identity. Sino-Platonic papers, no. 150. Philadelphia, PA: Dept. of East Asian Languages and Civilizations, University of Pennsylvania.
 Millward, James A. and Nabijan Tursun, (2004) "Political History and Strategies of Control, 1884–1978" in Xinjiang: China's Muslim Borderland, ed. S. Frederick Starr. Published by M. E. Sharpe. .
 Rall, Ted. Silk Road to Ruin: Is Central Asia the New Middle East? New York: NBM Publishing, 2006.
 
 Rudelson, Justin Ben-Adam, Oasis identities: Uyghur nationalism along China's Silk Road, New York: Columbia University Press, 1997.
 Thum, Rian. The Sacred Routes of Uyghur History (Harvard University Press; 2014) 323 pages
 Tyler, Christian. (2003). Wild West China: The Untold Story of a Frontier Land. John Murray, London. .

External links 

 Map share of ethnic by county of China
 Xinjiang Video Project

 
Articles containing video clips
Ethnic groups officially recognized by China
Islam in China
Muslim communities of China
Turkic peoples of Asia